GV Management Company, L.L.C. is a venture capital investment arm of Alphabet Inc., founded by Bill Maris, that provides seed, venture, and growth stage funding to technology companies. Founded as Google Ventures in 2009, the firm has operated independently of Google, Alphabet's search and advertising behemoth, since 2015. GV seeks to invest in startup companies in a variety of fields ranging from the Internet, software, and hardware to life science, healthcare, artificial intelligence, transportation, cyber security and agriculture.

History

 
The group was founded on March 31, 2009, with a $100 million capital commitment, by Bill Maris who also became GV's first CEO. In 2012, that commitment was raised to $300 million annually, and the fund has $2 billion under management. In 2014, the group announced $125 million to invest in promising European startups. By 2014, it had invested in companies such as Shape Security. In December 2015, the company was renamed GV and introduced a new logo. 

As of 2016, GV has been less active as a seed investor, instead shifting its attention to more mature companies. In 2020, GV hired Candice Morgan as the firm's first Diversity & Inclusion Partner and promoted Terri Burns from principal to the firm’s first Black female partner.

Structure
In 2013, GV developed an intensive, five-day design process, called a Design Sprint, which helps startups solve problems quickly. In addition, GV provides portfolio companies with access to operational help after making a financial investment. Full-time partners at GV work with portfolio companies on design and product management, marketing, engineering, and recruiting.

See also   
 List of venture capital firms
 CapitalG

References

External links
 

Financial services companies established in 2009
Venture capital firms of the United States
 
Private equity firms of the United States
Alphabet Inc.
Alphabet Inc. subsidiaries